The Cat is a 1988 German crime film directed by Dominik Graf.

Plot
Two criminals rob a bank and hold the clerks hostage, demanding 3 million German marks. Unaware to the police, the actual criminal mastermind witnesses their every move.

Cast

References

External links 
 

1988 films
1980s crime thriller films
1980s heist films
German crime thriller films
West German films
Films about bank robbery
Films about snipers
Films based on crime novels
Films based on German novels
German heist films
Films about hostage takings
1980s German-language films
1980s German films
Films directed by Dominik Graf